This is a list of the National Register of Historic Places listings in Keith County, Nebraska.  It is intended to be a complete list of the properties and districts on the National Register of Historic Places in Keith County, Nebraska, United States.  The locations of National Register properties and districts for which the latitude and longitude coordinates are included below, may be seen in a map.

There are 13 properties and districts listed on the National Register in the county.

Current listings

|}

Former listing

|}

See also

 List of National Historic Landmarks in Nebraska
 National Register of Historic Places listings in Nebraska

References

Keith
 
Buildings and structures in Keith County, Nebraska